Xanthandrus comtus is a species of hoverfly. It is found in the Palearctic.

Description
External images
For terms see Morphology of Diptera Wing length
Wide abdomen with yellow marks. Thoracic dorsum polished black. Male with round marks on tergite 2 and confluent marks on tergites 3 and 4 (as a deeply incised band). Female with oval marks on tergite 2 and square marks on tergites 3 and 4. legs mainly orange. Antenne orange. Long black pterostigma. The male genitalia and larva are figured by Dusek and Laska (1967). 
See references for determination.

Distribution
Palearctic Southern Norway South to Iberia. Ireland East through Central Europe and Southern Europe to Russia and the Caucasus and on to the Russian Far East and the Pacific coast; Japan; Formosa.

Biology
Habitat: Fagus, Quercus and Pinus forest and scrub.   
Flowers visited include umbellifers, Arbutus unedo, Filipendula, Juncus, Leontodon, Lonicera, Mentha aquatica, Rosa, Rubus, Succisa.

The larvae predate aphids and the caterpillars of various small moths including Tortricidae both on trees and low-growing plants. They are also predators of the caterpillars of the pine processionary moths Thaumetopoea pinivora and Thaumetopoea pityocampa.

References

Diptera of Europe
Syrphinae
Insects described in 1780